Rudolf Kühnel (25 February 1896 – 28 January 1950) was an Austrian racewalker. He competed in the men's 10 kilometres walk at the 1924 Summer Olympics.

References

External links
 

1896 births
1950 deaths
Athletes (track and field) at the 1924 Summer Olympics
Austrian male racewalkers
Olympic athletes of Austria
Place of birth missing